Ruslan Petrovych Rotan (born 29 October 1981) is a Ukrainian former professional footballer and manager of Ukraine national under-21 football team, FC Oleksandriya and current caretaker of the Ukraine national football team. He was a member of the Ukraine national team.

Club career
Rotan's career started off for Dnipro in the 1999–2000 season. He played a total of 105 matches for Dnipro and scored 11 goals.

He transferred to Dynamo Kyiv in the summer of 2005 and was given the number 14. In Dynamo, he played 50 matches and scored five goals in the Ukrainian Premier League.

During winter break 2007–08 Rotan was transferred back to his home club of Dnipro. The transfer fee was undisclosed. However, he signed a three-year contract with Dnipro. He now wears the number 29 jersey.

He became the top assister of the Ukrainian Premier League of the season 2008–2009.

In the summer of 2014, after his Dnipro contract had expired, Rotan went on trial with Rubin Kazan, nearly signing with the club before turning down the offer due to the political situation around the 2014 Russian military intervention in Ukraine. Rotan eventually signed a new three-year contract with Dnipro on 8 August 2014.

In the 2014–15 season, Rotan helped Dnipro reach the UEFA Europa League Final in Warsaw on 27 May 2015, in which he equalised the score at 2–2 with a free kick against holders Sevilla FC, who eventually won 3–2.

International career
Rotan made his debut for Ukraine on 12 February 2003, replacing Andriy Voronin for the final eight minutes of a goalless friendly against Turkey in İzmir. He scored three goals in seven games in 2006 FIFA World Cup qualification, going on to play three of their five matches (one start) as they reached the quarter-finals at the tournament. When Ukraine hosted UEFA Euro 2012, he played five minutes as a substitute for Voronin in their opening 2–1 victory over Sweden at the Olympic Stadium in Kyiv. With 100 caps, Rotan is Ukraine's third-most capped player of all time. He was also on Ukraine's World cup 2006 squad.
In the summer of 2017, Ruslan signed a one-year contract with the Slavia Prague club. He played 7 matches there.

Career statistics

Club

International
Scores and results list Ukraine's goal tally first, score column indicates score after each Rotan goal.

Managerial

Honours
Dynamo Kyiv
Ukrainian Premier League: 2006–07; runner-up: 2005–06
Ukrainian Cup: 2005–06, 2006–07
Ukrainian Super Cup: 2006, 2007

Dnipro
Ukrainian Premier League runner-up: 2013–14
UEFA Europa League runner-up: 2014–15
Ukrainian Cup runner-up: 2003–04

Individual
UEFA Europa League: Squad of the season 2014–15
Ukrainian Footballer of the Year: 2016

See also
 List of men's footballers with 100 or more international caps

References

External links

1981 births
Living people
Sportspeople from Poltava
FC Dynamo Kyiv players
Ukrainian footballers
2006 FIFA World Cup players
UEFA Euro 2012 players
Ukraine international footballers
FC Dnipro players
FC Dnipro-2 Dnipropetrovsk players
FC Dnipro-3 Dnipropetrovsk players
Ukrainian Premier League players
Ukrainian First League players
Ukrainian Second League players
UEFA Euro 2016 players
Association football midfielders
SK Slavia Prague players
Ukrainian expatriate footballers
Ukrainian expatriate sportspeople in the Czech Republic
Expatriate footballers in the Czech Republic
FIFA Century Club
Ukrainian football managers
Ukraine national under-21 football team managers
FC Oleksandriya managers
Ukraine national football team managers